Wrestling shoes are active wear used in competition and practice for the sport of wrestling. They are also used in mixed martial arts and professional wrestling. Generally light and flexible, they try to mimic the bare foot, while providing slightly more traction and ankle support and less chance of contracting a disease or hurting the opponent with exposed toe nails. As a result, wrestling shoes tend to have a high top design to provide ankle support and cushioning.

Some powerlifters find wrestling shoes to be useful when lifting because of how little shock absorption they provide.

See also

Wrestling singlet
Wrestling headgear
Amateur wrestling
Collegiate wrestling
Freestyle wrestling
Greco-Roman wrestling

References

Amateur wrestling
Sports footwear
Wrestling culture